Underground is a 1941 war, drama, suspense, espionage, propaganda, noir film about the German Nazi Resistance opposing the Nazis in World War II directed by Vincent Sherman. Jeffrey Lynn and Philip Dorn play two brothers initially on opposite sides.

Cast
 Jeffrey Lynn as Kurt Franken
 Philip Dorn as Eric Franken
 Kaaren Verne as Sylvia Helmuth
 Mona Maris as Fräulein Gessner
 Peter Whitney as Alex Schumann
 Martin Kosleck as Colonel Heller
 Erwin Kalser as Dr. Albert Franken
 Ilka Grüning as Frau Franken (credited as Ilka Gruning)
 Frank Reicher as Professor Hugo Baumer
 Egon Brecher as Herr Director of the Chemical Institute
 Ludwig Stössel as Herr Gustav Müller (credited as Ludwig Stossel)
 Hans Schumm as Heller's Aide
 Wolfgang Zilzer as Walter Hoffman
 Roland Varno as Ernst Demmler
 Henry Brandon as Josef Rolf
 Ludwig Hardt as Tobacco Clerk (uncredited)

References

External links
 
 
 
 

1941 films
Anti-fascist propaganda films
American World War II propaganda films
American black-and-white films
Films about the German Resistance
Films directed by Vincent Sherman
Films scored by Adolph Deutsch
Warner Bros. films
1940s war films